In the field of ordinary differential equations, the Mingarelli identity is a theorem that provides criteria for the oscillation and non-oscillation of solutions of some linear differential equations in the real domain. It extends the Picone identity from two to three or more differential equations of the second order.

The identity 
Consider the  solutions of the following (uncoupled) system of second order linear differential equations over the –interval :
 where . 
Let  denote the forward difference operator, i.e.
 
The second order difference operator is found by iterating the first order operator as in 
, 
with a similar definition for the higher iterates.
 

where 
 is the logarithmic derivative, 
, is the Wronskian determinant, 
 are binomial coefficients. 
When  this equality reduces to the Picone identity.

An application
The above identity leads quickly to the following comparison theorem for three linear differential equations, which extends the classical Sturm–Picone comparison theorem.

 

be three homogeneous linear second order differential equations in self-adjoint form, where 

Assume that for all  in  we have,
,
,
.

Notes

References

Ordinary differential equations
Mathematical identities